Tawaramachi Station (田原町駅) is the name of two train stations in Japan:

 Tawaramachi Station (Fukui)
 Tawaramachi Station (Tokyo)